The 1941 NCAA Golf Championship was the third annual NCAA-sanctioned golf tournament to determine the individual and team national champions of men's collegiate golf in the United States. The tournament was held at the Ohio State University Golf Club in Columbus, Ohio.

Stanford won  the team championship, the second title for the Indians. Earl Stewart from LSU captured the individual title.

Team results

Note: Top 10 only
DC = Defending champions
H = Hosts

References

NCAA Men's Golf Championship
Golf in Ohio
NCAA Golf Championship
NCAA Golf Championship
NCAA Golf Championship